Claude R. "Shug" McGaughey III  (born January 6, 1951) is an American Hall of Fame thoroughbred horse trainer.

In 1986, he got his big break when Ogden Phipps hired him to train his stable of horses. In 1988, McGaughey won the Eclipse Award for Outstanding Trainer in the United States. Among his many wins, he has captured the Jockey Club Gold Cup three times, the Travers Stakes four times, and won the 1989 Belmont Stakes with Hall of Fame Champion Easy Goer as well as the 2013 Kentucky Derby with Orb. McGaughey's nine Breeders' Cup victories ranks second to D. Wayne Lukas. Among the other horses he has trained are back-to-back Breeders' Cup Mile winner Lure and Hall of Famer Personal Ensign. McGaughey has accomplished the rare trifecta of training a Breeders' Cup winner, her daughter, and her granddaughter in the troika of Personal Ensign, My Flag and Storm Flag Flying. In 2013 he won his first Kentucky Derby with Orb.

In 2004, McGaughey was inducted into the National Museum of Racing and Hall of Fame. At his induction ceremony, he said: "My deepest debt of gratitude always has been and always will be to the Phipps family" and "My affiliation with the Phipps family is one of the great highlights of my life. I wouldn't be here without them."

References
 Shug McGaughey at the NTRA
 Biography and racing highlites for Claude R. McGaughey III at Keeneland
 

American horse trainers
United States Thoroughbred Racing Hall of Fame inductees
Eclipse Award winners
1951 births
Living people
Horse trainers from Lexington, Kentucky